Tang Qirun (born 11 March 2000) is a Chinese footballer currently playing as a midfielder for Jiangxi Beidamen.

Career statistics

Club
.

References

2000 births
Living people
Chinese footballers
Association football midfielders
China League Two players
China League One players
Shandong Taishan F.C. players